Treble & Tremble is the fourth album by Earlimart. The first single was "Heaven Adores You," and a music video was produced to accompany the song.

The album was influenced by Elliott Smith. In an interview with Pitchfork Media, Aaron Espinoza said "...Some people really took [Treble & Tremble] as a concept album or a tribute album to [Smith], and I wouldn't ever say that the album wasn't influenced by him, but it wasn't meant to be a tribute thing. But like I said, I can't ever, ever, ever be ashamed of my association with him. I cherish it every day."

Track listing
(All songs written by Earlimart)

 "Hold On, Slow Down" – 1:40
 "First Instant Last Report" – 2:27
 "The Hidden Track" – 4:12
 "Sounds" – 2:42
 "The Valley People" – 0:39
 "All They Ever Do Is Talk" – 3:57
 "A Bell And A Whistle" – 2:40
 "Broke The Furniture" – 3:28
 "Unintentional Tape Manipulations" – 5:56
 "Heaven Adores You" – 3:43
 "808 Crickets" – 0:49
 "Tell The Truth, Parts I & II" – 5:30
 "It's Okay To Think About Ending" – 5:00

External links
Earlimart's official website
Palm Pictures' website
Pitchforkmedia: Aaron Espinoza Interview

2004 albums
Earlimart (band) albums